Grégoire Barrère and Quentin Halys were the defending champions but chose not to defend their title.

Rafael Matos and David Vega Hernández won the title after defeating Hugo Nys and Jan Zieliński 6–4, 6–0 in the final.

Seeds

Draw

References

External links
 Main draw

BNP Paribas Primrose Bordeaux - Doubles
2022 Doubles